Margus may refer to:

 Margus (name), Estonian given name
 Margus (city), a former Roman city at the locality of modern Požarevac, Serbia
 Margus River, the Roman name of Great Morava; see Battle of the Margus